Aminu Alhassan (born 1 May 1995) is a Ghanaian professional footballer who last plays as a midfielder for Ghana Division One League side Vision FC. He previously played Premier league sides Accra Hearts of Oak and Accra Great Olympics.

Career

Early career 
Alhassan previously featured for Ghana Division One League side Amidaus Professionals before moving to Hearts of Oak in 2017.

Great Olympics 
After signing for Accra Hearts of Oak in 2017, he was sent on loan to city rivals Accra Great Olympics for the second round of the 2017 Ghana Premier League season. He featured in 10 league matches within that period.

Hearts of Oak 
In 2017, he moved to Accra Hearts of Oak, but he was sent on loan to city rivals Accra Great Olympics for the second round of  2017 Ghana Premier League season, returning at the end of the season. Upon his return, he made 11 league appearances in 2018 Ghanaian Premier League before the league was cancelled as a result of  the dissolution of the GFA in June 2018, due to the Anas Number 12 Expose. He went on to make 9 league appearances during 2019 GFA Normalization Committee Special Competition helping Hearts place 1st in group B. During the 2019–20 Ghana Premier League season, he became an auxiliary player as he was limited to just 2 league matches out of 14 before the league was cancelled due to the COVID-19 pandemic. In November 2020, he was named in the club's squad list for the upcoming season, but he was later released by the club in December 2020 with club with a few months left for his contract to expire.

Vision FC 
Alhassan moved to Ghana Division One League side Vision FC after parting ways with Hearts. On 20 February 2021, he made his debut in a goalless draw against Accra City FC. He was adjudged the man of the match at the end of the match.

References

External links 

 

Living people
1995 births
Association football midfielders
Ghanaian footballers
Accra Great Olympics F.C. players
Accra Hearts of Oak S.C. players